Lliwedd Bach is a top of Y Lliwedd in the Snowdonia National Park, North Wales. It is the last "top" on the main ridge of Y Lliwedd, the other being Y Lliwedd East Peak. A broad ridge at around 580m carries on northwards until the subsidiary summit of Gallt y Wenallt is reached.

The summit is unmarked and offers good views of Y Lliwedd's cliffs, Snowdon (Yr Wyddfa) and Crib Goch.

References

External links
 www.geograph.co.uk : photos of Y Lliwedd and surrounding area

Mountains and hills of Snowdonia
Nuttalls
Mountains and hills of Gwynedd
Beddgelert